The crimson-rumped waxbill (Estrilda rhodopyga) also known as rosy-rumped waxbill is a common species of estrildid finch found in eastern Africa. It has an estimated global extent of occurrence of 830,000 km2.

It is found in Burundi, The Democratic Republic of the Congo, Djibouti,  Egypt, Eritrea, South Africa, Ethiopia, Kenya, Malawi, Rwanda, Somalia, Sudan, Tanzania and Uganda. The IUCN has classified the species as being of least concern.

Origin
Origin and phylogeny has been obtained by Antonio Arnaiz-Villena et al. Estrildinae may have originated in India and dispersed thereafter (towards Africa and Pacific Ocean habitats).

References

External links
 BirdLife International species factsheet

crimson-rumped waxbill
Birds of East Africa
crimson-rumped waxbill